Tanyderidae, sometimes called primitive crane flies, are long, thin, delicate flies with spotted wings, superficially similar in appearance to some Tipulidae, Trichoceridae, and Ptychopteridae.  Most species are restricted in distribution.  They are found in many parts of the world, including North America, South America, Africa, Australia, New Zealand, and various islands in the Pacific Ocean.  Adults are usually found hanging from vegetation near streams.  Larvae are found either in sandy stream margins or in wet, rotten wood.  Fossil species are known.

Taxonomy 
Based on
 Nannotanyderinae 
 †Coramus 
Coramus gedanensis Baltic amber, Eocene 37.2 - 33.9 Ma
 †Dacochile Poinar & Brown, 2004
Dacochile microsoma, Burmese amber, Myanmar, Late Cretaceous (Cenomanian), 99 Ma
 †Nannotanyderus
Nannotanyderus ansorgei Lebanese amber, Early Cretaceous (Barremian), 130-125 Ma
Nannotanyderus grimmenensis "Green Series", Germany, Early Jurassic (Toarcian) 183 - 182 Ma
Nannotanyderus incertus Shar-Teg, Mongolia, Late Jurassic (Tithonian), 150.8 - 145.5 Ma
Nannotanyderus krzeminskii "Green Series", Germany, Toarcian, 183 - 182 Ma
Nannotanyderus kubekovensis Karabastau Formation, Kazakhstan Middle/Late Jurassic (Callovian/Oxfordian) 164.7 - 155.7 Ma
Nannotanyderus oliviae Charmouth Mudstone Formation, United Kingdom, Early Jurassic (Sinemurian), 196.5 - 189.6 Ma
Peringueyomyina
Peringueyomyina barnardi South Africa
 Tanyderinae
 †Espanoderus
Espanoderus barbarae Alava amber (Escucha Formation), Spain, Early Cretaceous (Albian) 105.3 - 99.7 Ma
Espanoderus orientalis Burmese amber, Myanmar, Cenomanian, 99 Ma
 †Similinannotanyderus 
Similinannotanyderus lii Burmese amber, Myanmar, Cenomanian, 99 Ma
Similinannotanyderus longitergata Burmese amber, Myanmar, Cenomanian, 99 Ma
Similinannotanyderus zbigniewi  Burmese amber, Myanmar, Cenomanian, 99 Ma
 †Macrochile 
Macrochile spectrum Baltic amber, Eocene 37.2 - 33.9 Ma
Macrochile hornei Baltic amber, Eocene 37.2 - 33.9 Ma
 †Podemacrochile 
Podemacrochile baltica Baltic amber, Eocene 37.2 - 33.9 Ma
 †Praemacrochile
Praemacrochile ansorgei Daohugou, China, Karabastau Formation, Kazakhstan Shar-Teg, Mongolia, Middle-Late Jurassic 164.7 to 145.5 Ma
 Praemacrochile chinensis Daohugou, China,  Callovian/Oxfordian ~ 160 Ma
 Praemacrochile decipiens Posidonia Shale, Germany, Toarcian 183.0 to 182.0 Ma
 Praemacrochile dobbertinensis, "Green Series", Germany, Toarcian 183.0 to 182.0 Ma
 Praemacrochile dryasis Daohugou, China,  Callovian/Oxfordian ~ 160 Ma
 Praemacrochile kaluginae Karabastau Formation, Kazakhstan Callovian/Oxfordian  164.7 to 155.7 Ma
 Praemacrochile ovalum Daohugou, China,  Callovian/Oxfordian ~ 160 Ma
 Praemacrochile stackelbergi Ichetuy Formation, Russia, Late Jurassic (Oxfordian) 159-156 Ma
 Protanyderus (extinct) Note: Lukashevich (2018) considers the assignation of these species to the living genus to be "in doubt" due to differing morphological characters
Protanyderus astictum Daohugou, China, Callovian/Oxfordian ~ 160 Ma
 Protanyderus invalidus  Itat Formation, Russia, Middle Jurassic (Bajocian-Bathonian) 171.6 - 164.7 Ma
 Protanyderus mesozoicus Tsagaantsav Formation, Mongolia, Barremian, 130-125 Ma
 Protanyderus nebulosus Shar-Teg, Mongolia, Tithonian, 150.8 - 145.5 Ma
Protanyderus savtchenkoi Karabastau Formation, Kazakhstan Callovian/Oxfordian  164.7 to 155.7 Ma
Protanyderus senilis Shar-Teg, Mongolia,  Tithonian, 150.8 - 145.5 Ma
Protanyderus vetus Shar-Teg, Mongolia,  Tithonian, 150.8 - 145.5 Ma
Protanyderus vulcanium Daohugou, China,  Callovian/Oxfordian ~ 160 Ma
Araucoderus
Araucoderus gloriosus, Chile
Eutanyderus
Eutanyderus oreonympha Australia
Eutanyderus wilsoni Australia
Mischoderus
Mischoderus annuliferus (Hutton, 1901), New Zealand
Mischoderus forcipatus  (Osten Sacken, 1880) New Zealand
Mischoderus marginatus  (Edwards 1923), New Zealand
Mischoderus neptunus  (Edwards 1923), New Zealand
Mischoderus varipes (Edwards 1923), New Zealand
Neoderus
Neoderus chonos Chile
Neoderus patagonicus Chile
Nothoderus
Nothoderus australiensis  Tasmania
Protoplasa
Protoplasa fitchii, United States
Protanyderus (extant) Note:  Villanueva (2017) considers Protanyderus to be a junior synonym of Protoplasa
Protanyderus alexanderi Kariya 1935  Japan (Shimajima-Dani)
Protanyderus beckeri (Riedel), 1920. Turkestan (Osch-Fergana)
Protanyderus esakii Alexander 1932  . Japan (Kyushu)
Protanyderus margarita Alexander 1948 USA (Rocky Mountains).
Protanyderus redeli Savchenko 1974  USSR (Gissar Range).
Protanyderus schmidi Alexander 1959 India (Uttar Pradesh)
Protanyderus sikkimensis Alexander 1961 India (Ramtang).
Protanyderus stackelbergi Savchenko 1971  Mongolia (Gatsur)
Protanyderus vanduzeei (Alexander 1918)  USA (California).
Protanyderus venustipes Alexander 1961 India (Ramtang).
Protanyderus vipio (Osten Sacken 1877)  USA (California).
Protanyderus yankovskyi Alexnder 1938 North Korea 
Radinoderus
 Radinoderus caledoniana Hynes, 1993 (New Caledonia) 
 Radinoderus dorrigensis Alexander, 1930. Australia (New South Wales). 
 Radinoderus holwai Alexander, 1946. Solomon Islands. 
 Radinoderus mirabilis (De Meijere), 1915a. Papua New Guinea.
 Radinoderus occidentalis (Alexander), 1925. Australia (West Australia).
 Radinoderus ochroceratus Colless, 1962. Papua New Guinea (Bouganville Island). 
 Radinoderus oculatus (Riedel), 1921. Papua New Guinea (PNG)
 Radinoderus ornatissimus (Doleschall), 1858. Indonesia (Maluku).
 Radinoderus pictipes Alexander, 1946. Indonesia (Irian Jaya). 
 Radinoderus solomonis (Alexander), 1924. Solomon Islands. 
 Radinoderus supernumerarius Alexander, 1953. Indonesia (Irian Jaya). 
 Radinoderus terrae-reginae (Alexander), 1924. Australia (Queensland)
 Radinoderus toxopei Alexander, 1959a. Indonesia (Irian Jaya).
Tanyderus 
Tanyderus pictus Philippi 1865 Chile, Concepcion

References 

Borror, D.J., C.A. Triplehorn, & N.A. Johnson. 1989. An Introduction to the Study of Insects, Sixth edition. Saunders College Publishing.
Krzeminski, W. & D.D. Judd. 1997. Family Tanyderidae. Pp. 281–289, in: Contributions to a Manual of Palaearctic Diptera, Vol.2. L. Papp & B. Darvas, eds. Science Herald, Budapest.
Poinar, G., Jr. & A.E. Brown. 2004. A New genus of primitive crane flies (Diptera: Tanyderidae) in Cretaceous Burmese amber, with a summary of fossil tanyderids. Proceedings of the Entomological Society of Washington, 106: 339–345.

External links 
Images at BugGuide

Nematocera families
Psychodomorpha